Mount Pinukis is a inactive volcano in Brgy. Lison Valley, Pagadian City, Philippines. It is the highest peak of Zamboanga del Sur and the entire Zamboanga Peninsula. 

Pinukis, the sacred mountain of the Subanen tribe, and a main source for the water system of the three provinces of the Zamboanga peninsula, is under threat from multinational mining companies who wish to engage in open-cast mining.

See also
Midsalip
Pagadian City

External links
https://www.slideshare.net/no2mininginpalawan/mt-pinukis-water-catchment

References

Inactive volcanoes of the Philippines
Landforms of Zamboanga del Sur